Browningia is a genus of cacti, comprising 11 accepted and 3 unresolved species. It is named for Webster E Browning (1869-1942), director of the Instituto Inglés, Santiago, Chile.

Synonymy
Synonyms of this genus are:
Azureocereus Akers & H.Johnson
Castellanosia Cárdenas
Gymnocereus Rauh & Backeb.

Species
 Browningia albiceps F.Ritter
 Browningia altissima (F.Ritter) Buxb.
 Browningia amstutziae (Rauh & Backeb.) Hutchison ex Krainz
 Browningia caineana (Cárdenas) D.R.Hunt
 Browningia candelaris (Meyen) Britton & Rose
 Browningia candelaris subsp. icaensis (F.Ritter) D.R.Hunt
 Browningia chlorocarpa (Kunth) W.T.Marshall
 Browningia columnaris F.Ritter
 Browningia hernandezii Fern.Alonso
 Browningia hertlingiana (Backeb.) Buxb.
 Browningia microsperma (Werderm. & Backeb.) W.T.Marshall
 Browningia pilleifera (F.Ritter) Hutchison
 Browningia riosaniensis (Backeb.) G.D.Rowley
 Browningia utcubambensis Hutch.
 Browningia viridis (Rauh & Backeb.) Buxb.

References

 The Plant List.org: Browningia

Cactoideae
Cactoideae genera
Cacti of South America
Endemic flora of Chile